Nordenskjold Outcrops is a rock outcrops on the west side of Longing Peninsula at the northeast end of Nordenskjold Coast. The feature extends south for 2 miles (3.2 km) from the vicinity of Longing Gap and is the type locality for the geologic Nordenskjold Formation. Named by the United Kingdom Antarctic Place-Names Committee (UK-APC) following British Antarctic Survey (BAS) geological work, 1987–88, after Otto Nordenskiöld, leader of the Swedish Antarctic Expedition, 1901–04, who explored this coast in 1902.

Fossils of the Jurassic cephalopod Trachyteuthis were discovered in this area in 1987–1988.

References

Rock formations of Graham Land
Nordenskjöld Coast
Paleontological sites of Antarctica